William Edward Childs (born March 8, 1957) is an American composer, jazz pianist, arranger and conductor from Los Angeles, California, United States.

Early life
When he was sixteen he attended the Community School of the Performing Arts sponsored by the University of Southern California. He studied music theory with Marienne Uszler and piano with John Weisenfluh. From 1975–'79 he attended the University of Southern California and received a degree in composition under the tutelage of Robert Linn.

While still a teen, Childs was playing professionally and he made his recording debut in 1977 with the J. J. Johnson Quintet during a tour of Japan, documented as "the Yokohama Concert". He gained significant attention during the six years (1978–84) he spent in trumpeter Freddie Hubbard's group. His early influences as a pianist included Herbie Hancock, Keith Emerson, and Chick Corea and as a composer, Paul Hindemith, Maurice Ravel and Igor Stravinsky. Childs nevertheless had an original conception of his own from near the start, developing his own voice as both a pianist and a composer in jazz and classical music genres.

His sister is the playwright Kirsten Childs.

Solo albums
Childs's solo jazz recording career began in 1988, when he released Take for Example, This..., the first of four critically acclaimed albums on Windham Hill Jazz. He followed that album with Twilight Is Upon Us (1989), His April Touch (1992), and Portrait of a Player (1993). Chick Corea asked Childs to join his label, Stretch Records. Childs's next album, I've Known Rivers appeared on Stretch/GRP (now Stretch/Concord) in 1995. This was followed by The Child Within on Shanachie Records in 1996.

Arranging 
In 2000 Childs arranged, orchestrated and conducted for Dianne Reeves's project The Calling: Celebrating Sarah Vaughan, which won the Grammy Award for Best Jazz Vocal Album. Other artists and producers for whom Childs has arranged include Sting, Yo-Yo Ma, Chris Botti, Gladys Knight, Michael Bublé, David Foster, Phil Ramone, and Claudia Acuña.

Jazz chamber ensemble 
In 2001 Childs formed a chamber jazz group consisting of piano, bass, drums, acoustic guitar, harp, and woodwinds. Sometimes the core group is augmented by string quartet, woodwind quintet, or both. Childs was influenced by Laura Nyro's collaborations with Alice Coltrane (on "Christmas and the Beads of Sweat") and by a desire to merge classical and jazz music. In 2005, the ensemble released its first album, Lyric, Jazz-Chamber Music, Vol. 1, which was nominated for three 2006 Grammy awards: Best Jazz Instrumental Album, Best Instrumental Composition, and Best Arrangement, winning for best instrumental composition, "Into the Light".

Awards and honors
 2003 New Composition Grant, Chamber Music America
 2006 Grammy Award for Best Instrumental Composition, "Into the Light"
 2006 Grammy Award, Best Arrangement Accompanying a Vocalist, "What Are You Doing The Rest of Your Life?"
 2009 Guggenheim Fellowship
 2011 Grammy Award for Best Instrumental Composition, "The Path Among the Trees"
 2013 Doris Duke Artist Award
 2015 American Academy of Arts and Letters Composer Award
 2015 Grammy Award for Best Arrangement, Instrumental and Vocals, "New York Tendaberry"
 2018 Grammy Award for Best Jazz Instrumental Album, Rebirth; Childs' solo on the track "Dance of Shiva" was also nominated for the Grammy Award for Best Improvised Jazz Solo.

Classical commissions
 1993 Los Angeles Philharmonic,"Tone Poem for Holly" (Esa-Pekka Salonen conductor)
 1994 Los Angeles Philharmonic, "Fanfare for the United Races of America" (EsaPekka Salonen conductor)
 1995 Akron Symphony Orchestra, "The Distant Land" (Alan Balter conductor)
 1997 Akron Symphony Orchestra and Chorus, "Just Like Job" (Alan Balter conductor)
 1997 Dorian Wind Quintet, "A Day in the Forest of Dreams" (Billy Childs piano, with Dorian Wind Quintet)
 2004 Los Angeles Philharmonic, "For Suzanne" (Dianne Reeves vocal soloist, Billy Childs piano soloist)
 2005 Los Angeles Master Chorale, "The Voices of Angels" (Grant Gershon conductor)
 2007 American Brass Quintet, "2 Elements" (Billy Childs piano, with American Brass Quintet)
 2009 Pacific Serenades, "String Quartet No. 1"
 2007 Fontana Chamber Arts, "The Path Among the Trees" (Billy Childs JazzChamber Ensemble with Ying Quartet)
 2010 Detroit Symphony, "Concerto for Violin and Orchestra" (Regina Carter, soloist)
 2012 Ying Quartet, "Awakening String Quartet No. 2" (The Ying Quartet)

Jazz commissions
 1992 Grenoble Jazz Festival, "Chamber Orchestra Music" (Steve Houghton soloist)
 1994 Monterey Jazz Festival, "Concerto Piano and JazzChamber Orchestra" (Billy Childs soloist)
 1997 Mancini Institute, "The Winds of Change" (Roy Hargrove soloist)
 2001 Kuumbwa Jazz Society, "Into the Light" (Billy Childs JazzChamber Ensemble)
 2004 Lincoln Center Jazz Orchestra, "The Fierce Urgency of Now" (Wynton Marsalis musical director)
 2010 Monterey Jazz Festival, "Music for Two Quartets" (Kronos Quartet with Billy Childs, Brian Blade, Scott Colley, and Steve Wilson)

Discography

As leader 
Source:

As sideman 
With Chris Botti
 When I Fall In Love (Columbia, 2004)With Bunky Green Healing the Pain (Delos, 1990)With J. J. Johnson and Nat Adderley' The Yokohama Concert (Pablo Live, 1978)
 Concepts in Blue (Pablo Today, 1981)
 Chain Reaction: Yokohama Concert, Vol. 2'' (Pablo, 2002) – recorded in 1977

References

External links

1957 births
Living people
20th-century American pianists
20th-century American male musicians
21st-century American pianists
21st-century American male musicians
African-American composers
African-American jazz musicians
African-American jazz pianists
African-American male composers
American male pianists
American male jazz musicians
Jazz musicians from California
Musicians from Los Angeles
Alexander Hamilton High School (Los Angeles) alumni
USC Thornton School of Music alumni
Grammy Award winners
Mack Avenue Records artists
Windham Hill Records artists
20th-century African-American musicians
21st-century African-American musicians
ArtistShare artists
Shanachie Records artists